Oktobar 1864 (trans. October 1864) was a Serbian and  former Yugoslav rock band.

Biography

1984 – 1992
Oktobar 1864 was formed in 1984 in Zemun by Goran Tomanović and have changed several line-ups before they won the Best demo Band Award at the MESAM festival in 1986. Goran Tomanović looked for first band members over the newspaper ads. The band had its first big performance in 1985 when they performed in Taš club in Belgrade, and that is when Tanja Jovićević, the band's lead singer, joined the group. After this, the band started the work on their debut, self-titled, album. The album was recorded in November and December 1986 in O Studio in Belgrade and produced by Saša Habić. It was released for the Jugodisk label. The line-up for this album was: Tanja Jovićević (vocals), Goran Tomanović (guitar), Željko Mitrović (bass guitar), Ivan Zečević (drums), Dean Krmpotić (keyboards), Marko Lalić (saxophone), Branko Baćović (trumpet) and Nebojša Mrvaljević (trombone). Guests on the album were Jovan Maljoković on saxophone, Saša Habić and Bojan Zulfikarpašić on keyboards, and former S Vremena Na Vreme members Ljuba Ninković and Asim Sarvan on backing vocals. This album featured hits "Nađi me" ("Find Me", a cover of the Four Tops' "Reach Out I'll Be There") and "Carte blanche". Minor hits were "Muzika noći" ("Music of the Night") and "Grad" ("The City").

The second album Igra bojama (Play with Colors) was recorded in February and March 1988 in O Studio in the new line-up, with Dejan Abadić (keyboards) and Vuk Dinić (trombone). The guests on the album were Rex Ilusivii on emulator, Dragan Kozarčic on trumpet, Josip Kovač Jr. on saxophone, Theodor Yanni on guitar, Sanja Čičanović and Milan Mladenović on backing vocals. The album was produced by Rex Ilusivii and Theodor Yanni and released through PGP-RTB. The major hit on the album was "Sam" ("Alone") and other notable songs were "Pratiš trag" ("You're Following the Trace") and "Senke 2" ("Shadows 2").

During 1989 Ljubinko Tomanović (bass guitar) and Slobodan Andrić (saxophone) joined the band. During the same year, Tanja Jovićević was voted the Best Singer of the Year by the readers of Pop rock magazine. The band played concerts with Ekatarina Velika and recorded the soundtrack for the film Početni udarac. In early 1990, Oktobar 1864 started to work on their third album Crni ples (Black Dance) in Pink Studio in Zemun. It was recorded in March 1990 in the studio of RTV Titograd. The band was accompanied by Deže Molnar on tenor and alto saxophone and keyboards, Dragan Kozarčić on trumpet, Anton Horvat on baritone saxophone, Milan Mladenović on backing vocals, Blagoje Nedeljković on drums (in "Denis") and Ted Yanni on guitar (guitar solo in "Crni ples"). The album was produced by the band and Theodor Yanni and released by PGP-RTB. This album featured hits "Crni ples" and "Denis". Minor hits were "E7/9" and "Osećam za tebe" ("I Feel for You"). In 1990, Oktobar 1864 also recorded the soundtrack for the documentary film Izlazak u Javnost (Coming out),  about the comic strip artist Emir Mesić from Zagreb. During the same year, the TV station SA 3 from Sarajevo recorded the documentary film Oktobar 1864 about the band.

Despite the fact they were praised by both fans and critics, due to the outbreak of the Yugoslav Wars, the band members decided to end their activity. The group disbanded in 1992 and the farewell concert was held in Belgrade's SKC in January 1992.

Post breakup
After the split up, Tanja Jovićević pursued solo career as a jazz singer. Goran Tomanović formed the alternative rock band Braća Left with Ljubinko Tomanović. Željko Mitrović founded Pink television and City Records label.

In 1997, City Records released the compilation album Najbolje with 12 songs. The editor for the album was Goran Tomanović.

Legacy
In 2011, the song "Crni ples" was polled, by the listeners of Radio 202, one of 60 greatest songs released by PGP-RTB/PGP-RTS during the sixty years of the label's existence.

Discography

Studio albums
 Oktobar 1864 (1987)
 Igra bojama (1988)
 Crni ples (1990)

Compilation albums
 Najbolje (1997)
 Ultimate Collection (2011)

References

 EX YU ROCK enciklopedija 1960-2006,  Janjatović Petar;

External links
Official Facebook
Oktobar1864 on Myspace.com

Serbian rock music groups
Yugoslav rock music groups
Funk rock musical groups
Musical groups from Belgrade
Musical groups established in 1984
Musical groups established in 1992